Real Talk Ent. is an American privately held record label that was started in 2003. It is led by CEO/President Derrick "Sac" Johnson and is focused primarily on recording and releasing new albums with Gold and Platinum selling Rap and R&B artists.

Studio albums

2004

 Spice 1 & MC Eiht – The Pioneers
 Kool Keith – Dr. Octagon Part 2
 Hollow Tip – Ghetto Famous
 D-Shot – Bosses In The Booth

2006

 Outlawz – Against All Oddz
 Layzie Bone – Thug Brothers
 Spice 1 & MC Eiht – Keep It Gangsta
 Bizzy Bone – The Story
 Dead Prez & Outlawz – Soldier 2 Soldier
 Celly Cel – The Wild West 
 Spice 1 – Life After Jive: 2000 to 2005
 Bizzy Bone – The Midwest Cowboy
 Celly Cel – The Hillside Stranglaz: Bad Influence
 Brotha Lynch Hung – The New Season

2007

 Bone Thugs-N-Harmony – Bone Brothers 2
 Bizzy Bone – Trials & Tribulations
 Bizzy Bone – Best of Bizzy Bone

2008

 Pastor Troy – Attitude Adjuster
 Lil' Flip – All Eyez on Us
 Bone Thugs-N-Harmony – Still Creepin on Ah Come Up
 8Ball – Doin' It Big
 YoungBloodZ – ATL's Finest
 MJG – Pimp Tight
 Lil' Scrappy – Prince of the South

2009

 Hell Rell – Hard as Hell
 Freeway – Philadelphia Freeway 2
 Haystak – The Natural II
 Sheek Louch – Life on D-Block
 Lil' Flip & Gudda Gudda – Certified
 AZ – Legendary
 Pastor Troy – Ready For War

2010

Case – Here, My Love
Devin the Dude – Gotta Be Me
Pastor Troy – Attitude Adjuster 2
Bizzy Bone – Best of Bizzy Bone Vol. 2
Young Buck – The Rehab
Spice 1 – Best of Spice 1 Vol. 2
Pastor Troy – Best of Pastor Troy Vol. 1
Pastor Troy – Best of Pastor Troy Vol. 2
8Ball & MJG – From the Bottom 2 the Top
Chingy – Success & Failure
Lil Scrappy – Prince of the South 2

2017

Lil Wyte – Drugs
Dorrough – Ride Wit Me
Gorilla Zoe – Don't Feed Tha Animals 2
Mozzy & Gunplay – Dreadlocks & Headshots
Gunplay – The Plug
Bone Thugs-N-Harmony & Outlawz – Thug Brothers 2
Krayzie Bone – Eternal Legend
Stalley – New Wave
Lil Wyte – Liquor
Gorilla Zoe – Gorilla Warfare
Gunplay – Haram
Bone Thugs-N-Harmony & Outlawz – Thug Brothers 3
Krayzie Bone - E.1999: The LeathaFace Project
Stalley – Another Level
Young Dro – Da' Real Atlanta

2019

Mozzy – Chop Stixx & Banana Clips
Krayzie Bone – Nothing Left To Prove
Young Dro – HyDROponic
Bone Thugs-n-Harmony – Greatest Hits (Real Talk Ent. Edition)
Young Buck – The Rehab: Remixed

2022

Snoop Dogg – Metaverse: The NFT Drop, Vol. 1

Snoop Dogg – Metaverse: The NFT Drop, Vol. 2

References

External links
 Official site
 

American independent record labels
Record labels established in 2003
Hip hop record labels
Gangsta rap record labels